The 1902–03 Irish Cup was the 23rd edition of the premier knock-out cup competition in Irish football. 

Distillery won the tournament for the 7th time, defeating Bohemians 3–1 in the final.

Results

First round

|}

Replay

|}

Quarter-finals

|}

Semi-finals

|}

Final

References

External links
 Northern Ireland Cup Finals. Rec.Sport.Soccer Statistics Foundation (RSSSF)

Irish Cup seasons
1902–03 domestic association football cups
1902–03 in Irish association football